The Lordsburg-Hidalgo County Library is a public library located at 208 E. Third St. in Lordsburg, New Mexico. The Lordsburg Women's Club established Lordsburg's library in 1919; it originally operated out of spaces in other public buildings and houses. The Works Progress Administration built a permanent building for the library in 1936–37. The library building has a Pueblo Revival design with adobe walls and vigas supporting the roof. A New Deal-commissioned oil painting titled Landscape in Talpa, which was given to the library upon its opening, decorates the inside. The library currently has over 20,000 volumes and is one of two county-funded libraries in New Mexico.

The library was added to the National Register of Historic Places on February 4, 2004.

See also

National Register of Historic Places listings in Hidalgo County, New Mexico

References

External links

Libraries on the National Register of Historic Places in New Mexico
Pueblo Revival architecture in New Mexico
Library buildings completed in 1937
Buildings and structures in Hidalgo County, New Mexico
National Register of Historic Places in Hidalgo County, New Mexico